William Fullarton was a Scottish politician.

William Fullarton may also refer to:

William Fullarton (footballer) (1882–?), Scottish football player 
William Fullarton (priest) (died 1655), Archdeacon of Armagh

See also

William Fullerton (disambiguation)
Fullarton (disambiguation)